The Obatogamau lakes constitute a group of freshwater bodies of the territory of Eeyou Istchee Baie-James, in the administrative region of Nord-du-Québec, in the province of Quebec, at Canada. These lakes extend mainly in the cantons of Dauversière, Fancamp, Haüy and Queylus.

Forestry is the main economic activity of the sector. The recreational tourism activities come second.

The hydrographic slope of Obatogamau Lakes is accessible by route 167 and the railway of Canadian National Railway. These two transportation routes link Chibougamau to Saint-Félicien, Quebec.

The surface of Obatogamau Lakes is usually frozen from early November to mid-May, however safe ice movement is generally from mid-November to mid-April.

Geography

Toponymy
The hydronym "Obatogamau lakes" was formalized in the early 1960s.

In 1870, during Richardson's expedition, these lakes were already known. Albert Peter Low, in 1884 and 1895, and Henry O'Sullivan, the same year, use the spellings Lake Obatigoman (1884), Lake Obatogaman (1884), Lake Obatagoman (1895) and Lake Obatagomau (1895). The 1904 Fifth Report of the Geographic Board of Canada, published in Ottawa, 1905, page 46, states: "Obatogamau; Lake, Chibougamau Lake, Abitibi District, Que.".

Of Cree origin, the term obatogamau means "lake with multiple straits or constricted by wood, vegetation".

In 1910, the Hudson's Bay Company built on the eastern shore of Lake La Dauversière a cabin that will become over the years a place of storage. Finally this cabin was deserted. Originally known as "Lac-Obatogamau Deposit", this name will be standardized in the form of "Lac-Obatogamau Deposit", as a locality, in 1988.

This set of lakes is dotted with hundreds of islands most of which are still unnamed. The largest is Weaver Island; this denomination is in honor of Kenneth Weaver, pilot of the military aviation during the Second World War and friend of the geologist Paul Imbault, responsible for an expedition to this region in 1950. On this occasion, the geologist has assigned names for the different parts of this body of water are the lakes La Dauversière and Le Royer, named after the township named in honor of Jerome Le Royer of La Dauversière, one of the founders of the Compagnie de Saint-Sulpice, Lakes Verneuil and Chevrier Lake), commemorating Jean-Jacques Olier of Verneuil and Pierre Chevrier, Baron de Fancamp, two members of this company and Lake Holmes, in memory of Stanley Holmes, one of the assistants of geologist Imbault. The name "Lacs Obatogamau" was officialized on December 5, 1968 by the Commission de toponymie du Québec when it was created.

Notes and references

See also 

Eeyou Istchee James Bay
Lakes of Nord-du-Québec
Nottaway River drainage basin